Paul L. Cordish (1909–2003) was an attorney and a member of the Maryland House of Delegates, he was also a businessman who worked for the Cordish Company and the founder of the Cordish Law Firm.

Early life and education
Cordish was born in Baltimore in 1909, he was a 1926 graduate of the Park School of Baltimore and earned his undergraduate degree at Johns Hopkins University. He earned his law degree, with honors, from Yale Law School in 1932. His father, Louis Cordish, was a cigar manufacturer who founded the Cordish Company in 1910 and served as the first president of the Shaarei Tfiloh Synagogue.

Career
After law school, in 1932, he founded the Cordish Law Firm and in 1933, he joined the Baltimore-based, family real estate business, the Cordish Company, founded by his father Louis Cordish in 1910. Cordish Law serves as the legal arm of Cordish Company. In 1934, Cordish was elected to the Maryland House of Delegates to represent the 4th legislative district in Baltimore City. He became the leader of what was then called the liberal bloc. From 1940 to 1941, he was the chairman of the House Committee on Intergovernmental Cooperation. He voted against the formidable lobby representing bar and saloon owners, and sought to strike out a requirement that witnesses and jurors profess belief in God. From 1963 to 1966, he served as president of the Hebrew Immigrant Aid Society. In this position, he was able to collect $3 million from the West German government for Nazi victims of the Holocaust in Baltimore.

Personal life
He married Ethel Patz; they had three sons: Joel A. Cordish of Jerusalem; Michael Cordish of Rehovot, Israel; and David S. Cordish of Baltimore. Ethel passed away at the age of 38.  In 1957, he married his second wife, Sylvia Cohn Bloom. He also has three stepchildren: Howard Paul Bloom of Lake Hill, N.Y.; Susan F. Abramson of Finksburg; and Marilyn E. Bloom of Pleasant Hill, California. His son Joel was beaten and paralyzed in an attack when he was a Ph.D. student at the University of Michigan.  His sons, Joel and Michael, became Orthodox Jews and moved to Israel. Joel died in 2010.

He died on April 8, 2003 and was interred at Shaarei Tfiloh Congregation Cemetery.

Past general election results
1938 Race for Maryland House of Delegates – 4th District
Voters to choose six:
{| class="wikitable"
|-
!Name
!Votes
!Outcome
|- 
|Leon Abramson, Democratic
|13,113 
|   Won
|- 
|Jerome Robinson, Democratic
|13,005 
|   Won
|- 
|Bernard S. Melnicove, Democratic
|12,979 
|   Won
|- 
|Leon A. Rubenstein, Democratic
|12,902  
|   Won
|- 
|Albert L. Sklar, Democratic
|12,727 
|   Won
|- 
|Paul L. Cordish, Democratic
|12,671  
|   Won
|- 
|W. A. C. Hughes, Jr., Republican 
|11,817   
|   Lost
|- 
|Arthur E. Briscoe, Republican 
|11,750    
|   Lost
|- 
|Sarah Fernandis Diggs, Republican 
|11,664   
|   Lost
|- 
|William Isaac Gosnell, Republican 
|11,556   
|   Lost
|- 
|Fannie A. Coplan, Republican 
|11,296    
|   Lost
|- 
|Benjamin M. Haughey, Republican 
|10,609    
|   Lost
|- 
|Albert E. Blumberg, Independent 
|578    
|   Lost
|}

References and notes

1909 births
2003 deaths
Democratic Party members of the Maryland House of Delegates
Politicians from Baltimore
American real estate businesspeople
Businesspeople from Baltimore
Cordish family
Jewish American state legislators in Maryland
20th-century American businesspeople
20th-century American Jews
20th-century American politicians